Saligny is a former commune in the Vendée department in the Pays de la Loire region in western France. On 1 January 2016, it was merged into the new commune of Bellevigny.

Education
There is one public school, École publique Sablier du Frêne, and one private school, École Primaire Privée Sacré Cœur, in Saligny. The public junior middle school Collège Antoine de Saint-Exupery is in nearby Belleville-sur-Vie.

The Saligny community has a library; the media centre is in nearby Belleville-sur-Vie.

See also
Communes of the Vendée department

References

Former communes of Vendée